Costa Rica sent a delegation to compete at the 2008 Summer Paralympics in Beijing, People's Republic of China. The delegation consisted of two competitors, both table tennis players.

Table tennis

See also
Costa Rica at the Paralympics
Costa Rica at the 2008 Summer Olympics

External links
 

Nations at the 2008 Summer Paralympics
2008
Summer Paralympics